20th Century Masters – The Millennium Collection: The Best of Three Dog Night is a compilation album of hits released by Universal Music as part of their 20th Century Masters – The Millennium Collection series.  Released on May 16, 2000 with hits from the 1970s American rock and roll band Three Dog Night with no new material recorded for the compilation.  As of August 2013, the album has sold 1,136,000 copies in the US.

Track listing

Personnel
Jimmy Greenspoon – Keyboardist
Joe Schermie – Bassist
Mike Allsup – Guitarist
Floyd Sneed – drummer
Danny Hutton – Vocalist
Cory Wells – Vocalist
Chuck Negron – Vocalist

Charts

Certifications

References

External links
20th Century Masters – The Millennium Collection Website
Three Dog Night official website

Three Dog Night compilation albums
Three Dog Night
2000 greatest hits albums
MCA Records compilation albums